The United States House of Representatives elections in California, 1960 was an election for California's delegation to the United States House of Representatives, which occurred as part of the general election of the House of Representatives on November 8, 1960. Democrats and Republicans each swapped a seat, leaving the balance at 16 Democrats and 14 Republicans.

Overview

Results 
Final results from the Clerk of the House of Representatives:

District 1

District 2

District 3

District 4

District 5

District 6

District 7

District 8

District 9

District 10

District 11

District 12

District 13

District 14

District 15

District 16

District 17

District 18

District 19

District 20

District 21

District 22

District 23

District 24

District 25

District 26

District 27

District 28

District 29

District 30

See also 
87th United States Congress
Political party strength in California
Political party strength in U.S. states
1960 United States House of Representatives elections

References 
California Elections Page
Office of the Clerk of the House of Representatives

External links 
California Legislative District Maps (1911-Present)
RAND California Election Returns: District Definitions

1960
California
United States House of Representatives